I'll Rise Again is a gospel album by Al Green, released in 1983.

The album peaked at No. 4 on the Billboard Top Gospel Albums chart. Green won the Grammy for "Best Soul Gospel Performance, Male".

Critical reception
The New York Times listed I'll Rise Again among the ten best albums of 1983.

Track listing
"It Don't Take Much" (Emmett Wilson, Hodges Wilson) - 3:23
"Jesus Is Coming (Back Again)" (Arthur Baker) - 4:59
"Leaning on the Everlasting Arms" - 2:38
"I Close My Eyes and Smile" (Johnny Brown, Emmett Wilson) - 3:23
"Ocean Blue (I'll Rise Again)" (Teenie Hodges, Emmett Wilson) - 4:13
"Look at the Things That God Made" (Arthur Baker) - 3:50
"I Just Can't Make It By Myself" (Clara Ward) - 4:25
"I Know It Was the Blood" (Michael Baker) - 5:15
"Straighten Out Your Life" (Jr. Lee) - 5:00

Personnel 
 Al Green – lead vocals, backing vocals, string arrangements 
 Jesse Butler – keyboards
 Jerry Peters – keyboards, synthesizers, string arrangements 
 Michael Baker – guitars, backing vocals 
 Mabon Hodges – guitars 
 Larry Lee – guitars 
 Steve Cobb – bass 
 Ray Griffin – bass 
 Steve Potts – drums 
 Memphis Symphony Orchestra – strings 
 William C. Brown III – backing vocals 
 Debra Carter – backing vocals 
 Linda Jones – backing vocals

Production 
 Producer – Al Green
 Engineer and Remix – William C. Brown III
 Mastered by Larry Nix at Ardent Mastering Lab 1 (Memphis, TN).
 Art Direction – Dennis Hill
 Photography – Alan Messer

References

1983 albums
Al Green albums